The 2008 Bucknell Bison football team was an American football team that represented Bucknell University during the 2008 NCAA Division I FCS football season. Bucknell finished fifth in the Patriot League. 

In their sixth season under head coach Tim Landis, the  Bison compiled a 5–6 record. Greg Jones, A.J. Kizekai, Kevin Mullen and Casey Williams were the team captains.

The Bison were outscored 339 to 269. Their 2–4 conference record placed fifth in the seven-team Patriot League standings. 

Bucknell played its home games at Christy Mathewson–Memorial Stadium on the university campus in Lewisburg, Pennsylvania.

Schedule

References

Bucknell
Bucknell Bison football seasons
Bucknell Bison football